Duane Morris LLP is a law firm headquartered in Philadelphia, Pennsylvania. The firm was founded in 1904 as Duane, Morris, Heckscher, & Roberts, and has offices in the United States, London, Singapore, Vietnam, Oman, Myanmar, Shanghai, and Taiwan. In addition to legal services, Duane Morris has independent affiliates in other disciplines.

Ranking and recognition
U.S. News & World Report awarded Duane Morris top-tier national rankings in bankruptcy and creditor debtor rights/insolvency and reorganization law, construction law and litigation, employee benefits law, health care law, immigration, insurance, patent law and venture capital law. In total, 28 Duane Morris practice groups were nationally ranked.

In 2014, the Am Law 100 ranked Duane Morris as the 71st largest law firm in the U.S. based on gross revenue.

Growth
Chair Sheldon Bonovitz stepped down at the beginning of January 2008 and was replaced by former Vice Chair John J. Soroko. Harvard Business School completed a case study of the firm's growth entitled "Duane Morris: Balancing Growth and Culture at a Law Firm," which was presented in the curriculum during the 2006–2007 academic year.

, the firm had more than 750 attorneys across 27 offices.

In January 2020, Duane Morris reached a merger agreement with Satterlee Stephens.

Notable cases and deals
 Markman v. Westview Instruments, Inc.: Duane Morris represented the plaintiff Markman in a patent infringement lawsuit. 
 Tobacco Industry Litigation: Duane Morris and the Pittsburgh law firm of Buchanan Ingersoll represented the Commonwealth of Pennsylvania in a 46-state class action lawsuit against the tobacco industry. The litigation concluded in 1998 with a $206 billion global settlement agreement for the 46 suing states.

Notable alumni
Barbara Adams, general counsel of Pennsylvania, under Governor Rendell
Michael Baylson, federal judge for the United States District Court for the Eastern District of Pennsylvania
Roland S. Morris, former United States Ambassador to Japan, one of the founding partners of the firm
Gene E. K. Pratter, federal judge for the United States District Court for the Eastern District of Pennsylvania
Marjorie Rendell, circuit judge in the United States Court of Appeals for the Third Circuit
Mark Singel, lieutenant governor of Pennsylvania from 1987 to 1995. Joined the firm in 2000 after leaving public service and left to start his own firm in 2005.

References

Further reading

External links

Organizational Profile of Duane Morris at the National Law Review

Law firms established in 1904
Law firms based in Philadelphia